Andrej Giňa (January 1, 1936 – September 30, 2015) was a Czech writer of Romani origin who specialised in the transcription of traditional Romani stories which were spread through word of mouth.

Biography 
His works have been praised by scholars in Central Europe and further afar as key aspects of Romani literature. His most famous work was adapted into film by CT1 - Dilino a Cert. Other works include Paťiv: ještě víme, co je úcta: vyprávění, úvahy, pohádky (2013) and Bijav: romane priphende = Svatba: romské povídky (1991).

Personal life 
Giňa was born into a family where music was a defining feature of life. His father was in fact a blacksmith and musician although he was illiterate. His short stay in Prague was followed by settling down in Rokycany, where in the 1960s his work was refused to be published. In 1989 he joined the Romani Citizens Initiative where he embarked on a journey of Romani rights in Czechoslovakia. Giňa was also part of a successful band which paved the way for other rom-pop artists called Rytmus 84. They had released several songs before their dissolution and remain an engrained part of Romani music to this day.

Death 
Giňa died 30 September 2015 of cancer. His funeral was attended by many supporters and fellow activists.

References

Czech male writers
Romani writers
1936 births
2015 deaths
Deaths from cancer in the Czech Republic